Canadian military bands are a group of personnel in the Canadian Armed Forces (CAF) that performs musical duties for military functions. Military bands form a part of the Music Branch of the CAF, composed of six full-time professional Regular Force bands, 15 Regular Force voluntary bands, and 53 part-time reserve force bands. Bands of the Music Branch are often badged with the unit or Canadian Forces base insignia that they support.

Regular Force musicians are selected nationally by competitive audition prior to enlisting. Members of these bands often come from prestigious conservatories and schools of music. Reserve force musicians are hired and trained at the discretion of the local unit to which they apply. Prior to 1994, the Canadian Forces School of Music trained all recruits, regardless of musical level, to performance standard with Regular Force bands, but this practice was halted due to defense budget cuts.

History

The earliest known activity of a Canadian military band performing during the Trooping of the Colour at the Champ de Mars in Montreal on 18 July 1867, over two weeks after the Confederation of Canada. The first full-time Canadian military band was formed in 1899 with the Royal Canadian Garrison Artillery in Quebec with Joseph Vézina as its bandmaster. In 1909, an order by Minister of Militia and Defence, Frederick William Borden, provided the basis that Canadian bands were to never be unionized, during which a violation of this would result in the prolonging of outside engagements with the American Federation of Musicians. Bands were spread across the country for most of the early to mid-20th century, with units such as the Canadian Military Engineers and The Canadian Guards maintaining regimental bands. The band of the latter unit was the basis for the establishment of the Band of the Ceremonial Guard in the modern Canadian Forces.

During the Second World War, the RCAF Overseas Headquarters Band became the first Canadian military band to be based outside the country on a permanent basis. In 1941, Captain Frank Coleman became the first Inspector of Bands for Canada, during which he standardized the musical requirements for members in Canadian bands. Captain Robert Farnon led the overseas-based Canadian Band of the Allied Expeditionary Force as its conductor/arranger, being the equivalent of the American Band of the AEF led by Major Glenn Miller. Alfred Edward Zealley, a Naval officer who was considered to be the "Father of the Royal Canadian Navy
bands", became director of music of the RCN in 1939 after her created a permanent music band at no cost to the Naval Service of Canada. Over the course of 4 years, he organized 19 navy bands for active service and oversaw the RCN School of Music in Toronto.

During the Korean War there was a large expansion of the army, and the size and number of bands increased. In 1954, a school of music was established in Esquimalt, originally for musicians of the Royal Canadian Navy (RCN), but now for all Canadian Forces musicians to receive training, being the Canadian equivalent of the United States Armed Forces School of Music and the Royal Military School of Music. The largest gathering of Canadian military bands took place in 1967 during the Canadian Armed Forces Tattoo 1967 for the Canadian centenary. In 1974, Lynn Hong became the first woman to join a military band in Canada. Until the early 21st century the Music Branch also had drum and bugle corps and corps of drums within all branches of the CAF (the former formation is now only present in a few bands of the reserve formations). In 1994, the federal budget of Prime Minister Jean Chrétien resulted in the disbanding of five of the nine regular force bands. In June 1997, Art Eggleton, Minister of National Defence announced a restructuring of the Music Branch to included  the creation of a new band in Victoria and another one in Edmonton, acting a full-time regular force naval band in the West.

Pipes and drums
Following the defeat of the Jacobite Army, which drew its main strength from Highland clans, in the Battle of Culloden in 1746, the British placed a ban on Highland influences such as bagpipes. As a result, many Scottish pipers immigrated to North America, often settling the bagpipe culture on the eastern coast in what is now Nova Scotia and New Brunswick. During the Seven Years' War and the American Revolution, the British government employed Scottish pipers. The great Highland bagpipe was a popular type of bagpipe used by Canadian pipe bands during the First World War. During this period, Canadian regiments often had pipe bands who played during battle alongside their units. The most notable among these bands was the Pipe Band of the 16th Battalion (Canadian Scottish), CEF, which was called in to escort the unit in the war.

By the time the Second World War ended, there was no full-time pipe band in the Canadian Army. When the Korean War broke out in 1950, a pipe band was authorized in the 27th Canadian Infantry Brigade known as the 1st Canadian Highland Battalion. It later became the Canadian Guards Pipe Band. In 1951, there were 24 reserve pipe bands. By 1965, there were 30 pipe bands divided into the following military commands and areas: 2 (Eastern Command), 1 (Quebec Command), 4 (Eastern Ontario Area), 8 (Central Ontario Area), 4 (Western Ontario Area), 2 (Manitoba Area), 3 (Saskatchewan Area), 3 (Alberta Area), 3 (British Columbia Area).

It was only in 1915 with the creation of the 110th Irish Regiment that an Irish-type pipe band was created following the example of the Scottish regiments of infantry, but this band was later disbanded.

Corps of drums 

The earliest example of a Canadian corps of drums are found through the Fort Henry Guard and the Fort York Guard, historical group who both sport corps of drums that include fifes and are led by a drum major and a drum sergeant. During the Second World War, many regiments maintained small corps of drums that were stationed at all major bases. While most of them were staffed by active duty troops, others were volunteer corps of drums (and later drum and bugle corps) staffed by reservists and professional civilian percussionists. Corps of drums have been historically been based on the front-rank tradition of the Royal Marines Band Service. In the late 1940s, the Naval Band Service of the RCN and the HMCS Naden School of Music, alongside bands from several line infantry regiments of the Primary Reserve, continued this tradition. With the unification of the CAF in 1968, corps of drums in both the RCN and the regular army withered away as various bands were merged. While the navy recovered from this particularly in the mid-1980s within naval reserve bands, most of the army bands never recovered.

The sole corps of drums in service today within the Canadian Army is assigned to Princess Patricia's Canadian Light Infantry, and is modelled on the Corps of Drums of the British Army Royal Logistic Corps. Members are not professionally trained nor educated in music and are instead active soldiers who have chosen to participate in the corps. In July 2013, a five-sailor corps of drums in the Naden Band made a return to the public at the Victoria Day Parade.

Drum and bugle corps 
The tradition of the drum and bugle corps of Canada's armed forces began in 1860 with the Second Battalion Volunteer Militia Rifles of Canada (later named The Queen's Own Rifles of Canada, a regiment of the Army Primary Reserve), which raised the first true military DBC in the country. Francis Clark was the bandmaster and bugle major of this pioneer formation. Charles Swift succeeded him when he died in 1876, and when the regimental bugle corps began touring US cities, it helped usher the era of military and civilian drum and bugle corps all over the world, not just in North America. Their influence was also a factor in the formation of the American and Canadian marching band culture, co-shared with the British tradition already in place. The traditions of the regimental bugle corps of The Queen's Own Rifles, in later decades of the 20th century, formed the basis of the Canadian military and civilian drum and bugle corps tradition.

The Queen's Own Rifles were not alone in forming the drum and bugle corps tradition in Canada. In the 1880s, they were followed by another, La Musique des Voltigeurs de Québec, of another Primary Reserve regiment, Quebec City's Les Voltigeurs de Québec. Their drum and bugle corps closely followed the traditions of the Queen's Own Rifles combined with the by now active fanfare band traditions of the French Army line and light infantry during the period in France. It too toured the country, most especially in French-speaking Quebec. Today, the historic traditions of these two regimental drum and bugle corps continue.

The drum and bugle corps of these two regiments spawned countless other bugle bands around Canada and the northern United States, both military and civil, and several of these corps are active today in Canada, either as affiliated ensembles, or as part of the Canadian Cadet Organizations.

Bands based on demographics
In the mid-1910s, a band was raised in the No. 2 Construction Company, which was the first all-black unit in the Canadian military. The band was created to perform at civic gatherings and in black churches. In 1917, it performed at the Dominion Day festivities, with a war diary noting that their performance "greatly assisted in entertaining the crowd and making the holiday a success." At the time of World War Two, various all-female bands were formed throughout the services. In the RCAF, the female band unit was the RCAF Women's Division Band (notably led by Maurice Dunmall from 1943 to 1944), while in the army the women's unit was known as the Canadian Women's Army Corps Pipe/Brass Band.

Band characteristics
The Canadian Armed Forces mandate the existence of 2 distinct band types. Military bands are typically structured as brass and reed bands, or pipe and drum bands. These statuses, as defined in Queen's Regulations and Orders Chapter 32 and the Canadian Forces Band Instructions, requires that the bands follow all of the applicable Department of National Defence and Canadian Forces regulations concerning military bands and the provision of musical support. When two bands are perform together, they are referred to as Combined Bands. When more than two bands are on parade, they are referred to as Massed Bands. Formerly, 2 more band types existed, corps of drums and drum and bugle corps.

Brass and reeds bands are performing ensembles consisting of several members of the woodwind instrument family, brass instrument family, and percussion instrument family.

Pipe and drum bands are performing ensembles consisting of bagpipes, and a drum corps composed of a bass drum, scottish tenor drums and snare drums.

Reserve corps of drums, active in a few regiments, are performing ensembles consisting of a percussion section made up of a bass drum, clash cymbals, tenor drums and snare drums (plus the optional glockenspiel/s) and a woodwind section of fifes and flutes. Bugles may also be carried by the woodwind section in keeping with British practice.

Reserve drum and bugle corps, active till the late 1990s, were generally similar to the others but consisted of percussion similar to the corps of drums with the addition of multiple tenor drums and bugles and variants of the brass instrument family (trumpets, cornets, soprano bugles, tenor valved bugles, alto bugles, mellophones, French horn bugles, marching baritones and contrabass bugles). Many drum and bugle corps of the Canadian Cadet Organizations follow the practice of these bands. These formations formerly were present in active Army and Navy formations.

Most brass and reed bands also form smaller ensembles to suit a variety of performance venues, including show bands, jazz ensembles, string quartets, rock bands, Celtic ensembles, brass quintets, woodwind quintets, parade bands, and Dixie bands.

Performances

Military bands in the Canadian Armed Forces perform as a marching band in parades, military parades, or seated, in concert, and play a part in military funeral, convocation, ceremonies such as Trooping the Colour, and parades. They participate in community events such as Remembrance Day parades and band concerts. Depending on location, bands wear a mix of authorized military service dress; such as ceremonial dress (including Highland dress), service dress, and operational dress.

Military bands perform at military tattoos within and outside Canada, presenting musical mass performances, with choreographies and multi-media effects. The military bands play ceremonial and marching music, including the national anthems and patriotic songs. A concert band's repertoire includes original wind compositions, arrangements of orchestral compositions, light music, popular tunes and concert marches found in standard repertoire.

Military festivals and tattoos situated in Canada include:

 Canadian International Military Tattoo
 Fort Henry Sunset Ceremony
 Fortissimo Sunset Ceremony
 Hamilton Military Tattoo
 Royal Nova Scotia International Tattoo

In addition to regularly scheduled events, the Canadian Forces' pipe and drum bands occasionally compete in civilian pipe band competitions with varying degrees of success. Past notable events where Canadian Forces bands have participated in include the Canadian Armed Forces Tattoo 1967, and the Quebec City International Festival of Military Bands.

Professional bands

There are six full-time professional bands of the Canadian Armed Forces Regular Force. Two professional bands operate with the Canadian Army, two are operated with the RCN, one is operated with the Royal Canadian Air Force (RCAF). In addition to the five professional bands managed by the three service branches, there is also the Central Band of the Canadian Armed Forces, which is the senior band in the Music Branch and reports directly to the CAF Headquarters and the Ministry of National Defence. All six full-time professional bands of the Canadian Armed Forces are brass and reed bands, a band consisting of brass instruments and woodwind instruments.

The Canadian Army operates two full-time professional bands, the Musique du Royal 22e Régiment and the Royal Canadian Artillery Band. The Musique du Royal 22e Régiment is based in Saint-Gabriel-de-Valcartier, while the Royal Canadian Artillery RCA band is based in Edmonton.

The RCAF operates one full-time professional band, the Royal Canadian Air Force Band. The RCAF Band is based in Winnipeg.

The RCN operates two full-time professional bands, one for each operational area of the RCN, Atlantic and Pacific. The Stadacona Band is based in Halifax, and represents Maritime Forces Atlantic, whereas the Naden Band represents Maritime Forces Pacific, based in Esquimalt.

Voluntary bands
There are 15 voluntary bands within the Canadian Army and the RCAF. Voluntary bands are a part of the Canadian Armed Forces Regular Force, although their band members are not composed of full-time professional musicians. By custom, civilian volunteer musicians parading as part of a band may be authorized to wear the uniforms of that band as optional items. No rank insignia shall be worn unless the individual holds that rank by right. Appointment badges such as that of drum major may be worn.

List of voluntary bands

Canadian Army

The Canadian Army maintains six voluntary bands within the Canadian Army Regular Force. The Band of the Royal Military College of Canada, and the CFB Borden Brass and Reed Band are the only brass and reed voluntary bands in the army, with the other four being pipes and drum bands. Voluntary bands in the Canadian Army include:

 2nd Canadian Mechanized Brigade Group Pipes and Drums Band	
 2nd Battalion, The Royal Canadian Regiment Pipes and Drums Band	
 Band of the Royal Military College of Canada (RMC Band)
 Camp Gagetown Pipes and Drums
 Canadian Forces Base Borden Brass and Reed Band
 Canadian Forces Base Borden Pipes and Drums Band

Although not officially part of the army structure, the Communications and Electronics Garrison Band at CFB Kingston serves as a voluntary band.

Royal Canadian Air Force
The RCAF has eight authorized voluntary bands, located at 4 Wing Cold Lake, 8 Wing Trenton, 12 Wing Shearwater, 14 Wing Greenwood, and 22 Wing North Bay. With the exception of 4 and 22 Wing, they consist of a voluntary brass-reed concert band and a voluntary pipe and drum band. In addition to the pipe & drum bands of the four wings, the RCAF also maintains the RCAF Pipes and Drum, a pipe and drums band. Voluntary bands in the RCAF include:

 4 Wing Brass and Reed
 8 Wing Brass and Reeds
 8 Wing Pipes and Drums
 12 Wing Pipe and Drums Band supporting 406 and 423 MHS in Shearwater N.S. and 443 MHS in Sidney, B.C.
 14 Wing Brass and Reed Band
 14 Wing Pipes and Drums Band
 22 Wing Band
 Royal Canadian Air Force Pipes and Drums

Reserve Force bands
The three service branches of the Canadian Armed Forces also maintain military bands for their Primary Reserve units. Reserve Force bands are typically manned by part-time musicians with the Primary Reserve, and are staffed with one or two Regular Force members who serve as musical instructors and administrators.

Canadian Army
The Canadian Army maintains a number of military bands in order to support various units of the Canadian Army Reserve.

Brass and reed bands

 1st Battalion, The Royal Newfoundland Regiment Band
 3rd Field Regiment RCA, 37 CBG (NB) Band
 5th (BC) Field Regiment, Royal Canadian Artillery Band
 6th Battalion Royal 22e Régiment Band (Musique de la Garde en rouge)
 7th Toronto Regiment RCA Band	
 15th Field Artillery Regiment RCA Band	
 36 CBG (NS) Band Halifax
 62nd Field Artillery Regiment, RCA Band
 Band of the Ceremonial Guard
 Band of The Royal Regiment of Canada
 Le Régiment du Saguenay Band	
 Les Fusiliers Mont-Royal Band
 Les Fusiliers de Sherbrooke Band
 Les Voltigeurs de Québec Band
 Regimental Band of the Governor General's Foot Guards
 Regimental Band of the Governor General's Horse Guards
 Regimental Band of The Royal Hamilton Light Infantry
 The Brockville Rifles Band
 The King's Own Calgary Regiment Band
 The Lincoln and Welland Regiment Association Band
 The Prince Edward Island Regiment (RCAC) Band
 The Regimental Band and Bugles of The Queen's Own Rifles of Canada
 The Royal Winnipeg Rifles Band	
 The Windsor Regiment (RCAC) Band
 The British Columbia Regiment Band
 The Loyal Edmonton Regiment Band
 The Queen's York Rangers (1st American Regiment) (RCAC) Band
 Royal Westminster Regiment Band

Pipe and drums bands

 The Nova Scotia Highlanders Pipe Band	
 26th Field Regiment RCA Pipe Band	
 48th Highlanders of Canada Pipes & Drums
 49th Field Artillery Regiment, RCA Pipe Band
 Stormont, Dundas and Glengarry Highlanders Pipe Band	
 The Argyll and Sutherland Highlanders of Canada (PL) Pipe Band
 The Black Watch (Royal Highland Regiment) of Canada Pipe Band
 Regimental Pipes and Drums of The Calgary Highlanders
 The Canadian Scottish Regiment (Princess Mary's) Pipe Band	
 The Cape Breton Highlanders Pipe Band		
 The Essex and Kent Scottish Pipe Band
 The Lorne Scots (Peel, Dufferin and Halton) Regiment Pipe Band
 The North Saskatchewan Regiment Pipe Band
 The Pipes and Drums of The Cameron Highlanders of Ottawa
 The Queen's Own Cameron Highlanders of Canada Pipe Band	
 The Royal Highland Fusiliers of Canada Pipe Band
 The Seaforth Highlanders of Canada Pipe Band
 The Toronto Scottish (Queen Elizabeth, The Queen Mothers' Own) Regiment Pipe Band

Royal Canadian Air Force

The Air Reserve maintains three military bands. The 400 Tactical Helicopter Squadron Pipe Band, and the 402 Squadron Pipes and Drums are pipe and drum bands, the former based at CFB Borden, the latter based in Winnipeg. The Air Reserve also maintains one brass and reed band, the Musique du 438e Escadron tactique d'hélicoptères, based in Montreal.

Royal Canadian Navy
The Canadian Forces Naval Reserve maintains six military bands. Each summer, musicians from the six active Naval Reserve bands come together to form the National Band of the Naval Reserve and perform throughout Canada. They have played at every Halifax International Tattoo since the mid-1970s, performed on Parliament Hill, at the National War Memorial, at Grey Cup parades, for royal tours and other events. The six active reserve bands in the RCN include:

 HMCS Chippawa Band
 HMCS Montcalm Band
 HMCS Star Band
 HMCS Tecumseh Band
 HMCS Donnacona Band
 HMCS York Band

Former military bands

Bands converted into civilian bands
Several civilian-operated marching bands in Canada were originally established as military bands before being reorganized into civilian bands. Former Canadian Army bands that were reorganized into civilian-operated bands includes the Oshawa Civic Band and the Toronto Signals Band; the former formerly serving as the band for The Ontario Regiment, while the latter was formerly the band for the 2nd Armoured Divisional Signals Regiment.

The Concert Band of Cobourg (The Band of Her Majesty's Royal Marines Association, Ontario), traces its origins to the Band of the 6th Northumberland Militia, a civilian-operated band that provided musical support for the unit. The band was briefly under military administration from 1898 to 1905, as the 40th Battalion Artillery Band, before it was re-instituted as a civilian band.

Disbanded military bands

The following is a list of notable military bands in Canada that have since been disbanded:

The Canadian Guards Band
19th Medium Regiment, RCA Pipes and Drums
Princess Patricia's Canadian Light Infantry Band
Royal Canadian Regiment Band
Canadian Grenadier Guards Band
Royal Canadian Dragoons Band
Calgary Highlanders Military Band
Band of the Royal Canadian Corps of Signals
Band of the Royal Canadian Engineers
Royal Canadian Ordnance Corps Band
Royal Canadian Army Service Corps Band
Montreal Garrison Band
1 Service Battalion Band
Land Force Western Area Band
First Canadian Army Band
Band of the 48th Squadron, RCE
Hamilton Army Navy Veterans Band
Royal Roads Military College Band
RCAF Overseas Headquarters Band
Women's Division Band of the RCAF
No. 6 Bomber Group Band
Corps of Royal Canadian Electrical and Mechanical Engineers Trumpet Band
The Elgin Regiment Trumpet Band
Victoria Rifles Bugle Band
The Canadian Scottish Regiment (Princess Mary's) Brass Band
Princess of Wales Own Regiment Bugle Band
Elgin Regiment Trumpet Band
CFB Lahr Pipes and Drums

See also

 Authorized marches of the Canadian Armed Forces
 Canadian pipers in World War I
 Music Branch (Canadian Forces)
 List of pipe bands
 Navy bands in Canada
 List of Royal Canadian Air Force Bands
 British military bands
 United States military bands

References

Further reading
 CWO (Ret'd) Jack Kopstein CD When the Band Begins to Play: A History of Military Music in Canada (1992).
 CWO (Ret'd) Jack Kopstein CD & Ian Pearson The Heritage of Military Music in Canada (St. Catharines, Ont.: Vanwell Pub., 2002)
 CWO (Ret'd) Jack Kopstein CD & Ian Pearson The History of the Marches in Canada: Regimental/Branch/Corps (Hignell Printing Ltd, 1994).

External links

 
 List of Canadian Forces Bands
CF Drum Major Drill Demonstration

Wind bands
 
Military bands of Canada